This article lists the colonial and departmental heads of French Guiana, since the establishment of the French suzerainty over the territory of French Guiana in 1643, to the present day.

(Dates in italics indicate de facto continuation of office)

Ancien Régime

First Republic and Empire

Bourbon Restoration and July Monarchy

Second Republic and Empire

Third Republic

Fourth and Fifth Republic

See also
 Politics of French Guiana
 History of French Guiana

References

External links
 World Statesmen – French Guiana

French Guiana-related lists
French Guiana